The SG Barockstadt Fulda-Lehnerz is a German association football club from the Lehnerz suburb of Fulda, Hesse.

The club's greatest success has been to earn promotion to the tier four Regionalliga Südwest in 2022.

History

The club was formed on 2 December 1965 as Turn- und Sportverein Lehnerz and joined competitive football a year later, in 1966. The first three decades of its history the club spent as a non-descript amateur side in local football. TSV for the first time moved up into the higher levels of Hesse football in 1997 when it won promotion to the tier five Landesliga Hessen-Nord, rebranded the Verbandsliga in 2009.

Lehnerz would play the next sixteen seasons at this level, generally achieving good results and finishing in the upper half of the table. It finished runners-up in 2007 and, again in 2012 but failed to win promotion on each occasion. The 2012–13 season proved to be the most successful for the club, winning its Verbandsliga division and thereby direct promotion to the tier five Hessenliga.

In its first season in the Hessenliga the club finished in fourth place. In 2014–15 the club finished runners-up in the league and thereby earned the right to take part in the promotion round to the Regionalliga Südwest. After two draws the club missed out on promotion with Bahlinger SC promoted instead.

In April 2018, TSV acquired the men's first team of Borussia Fulda, which resigned from the Hessenliga, but remained as an association and continued to provide youth teams. The club was renamed SG Barockstadt Fulda-Lehnerz and received a new logo and new club colours. With the addition of the name Barockstadt, the connection to the city of Fulda has been emphasised. On 1 July, all these became official.

Honours
The club's honours:
 Verbandsliga Hessen-Nord
 Champions: 2013
 Runners-up: 2007, 2012
 Bezirksoberliga Fulda
 Champions: 1997

Recent seasons
The recent season-by-season performance of the club:

With the introduction of the Regionalligas in 1994 and the 3. Liga in 2008 as the new third tier, below the 2. Bundesliga, all leagues below dropped one tier.

Key

References

External links
 Official team site  
 Das deutsche Fußball-Archiv  historical German domestic league tables

Football clubs in Germany
Football clubs in Hesse
Association football clubs established in 1965
1965 establishments in West Germany
Fulda